Amor, siempre amor is a studio album by Mexican singer Flor Silvestre, released in 1970 by Musart Records.

Critical reception
Record World gave the album a rave review and described it in two words: "Superb repertoire!" It also wrote that "Flor Silvestre is one of the best 'ranchera' singers in Mexico and is selling big in California, Colorado, Arizona, Mexico, New York and Texas".

Track listing
Side one
 "La cruz de lo imposible" (Guadalupe Ramos) – 2:09
 "La mitad de mi orgullo" (José Alfredo Jiménez) – 2:58
 "Cantares de amor" (Sebastián Curiel) – 2:32
 "Paredes viejas" (Antonio Valdés Herrera) – 2:37
 "Necesito un corazón" (Felipe "Indio" Jiménez, Guillermo Acosta) – 2:31
 "Tu amargura" (Laureano Martínez Smart) – 2:28

Side two
 "Como un remolino" (Rubén Méndez del Castillo) – 3:04
 "Aprendí a llorar" (Ángel Cabral, Carlos Medina) – 2:21
 "Dos corazones" (arranged by Rubén Méndez del Castillo) – 2:45
 "Tanto amor que abandoné" (Rubén Méndez del Castillo) – 2:21
 "Tus acacias" (Indalecio Ramírez) – 1:55
 "Adiós al fin" (Rubén Méndez del Castillo) – 2:39

Personnel
 Mariachi Guadalajara – accompaniment

References

External links
 Amor, siempre amor at AllMusic

1970 albums
Flor Silvestre albums
Musart Records albums
Spanish-language albums